Black and Yellow#Remakes and freestyles
Jeremiah Peabody's Polyunsaturated Quick-Dissolving Fast-Acting Pleasant-Tasting Green and Purple Pills
Nika riots of Constantinople, between the Blue and Green groups
The Geometry of Shadows - Babylon 5 episode featuring riots between Purple and Green groups, in reference to the Nika riots